Franz Pfannl was an Austrian Watchmaker and manufacturer most famous for his 2.7mm Kolibri pistol, designed in 1910 and produced from 1914 to 1938. He had financial help for the pistols from Georg Grabner. The pistol was marketed for self-defense but was fairly poor in its use, due to the low penetration of the round.

References

Watchmakers (people)
1866 births
1961 deaths